The following are List of roads in Toronto divided by direction.

 List of north–south roads in Toronto
 List of east–west roads in Toronto
 List of contour roads in Toronto

Toronto-related lists